The Harvard Computers were a team of women working as skilled workers to process astronomical data at the Harvard Observatory in Cambridge, Massachusetts, United States. The team was directed by Edward Charles Pickering (1877 to 1919) and, following his death in 1919, by Annie Jump Cannon.

"The women were challenged to make sense of these patterns by devising a scheme for sorting the stars into categories. Annie Jump Cannon's success at this activity made her famous in her own lifetime, and she produced a stellar classification system that is still in use today. Antonia Maury discerned in the spectra a way to assess the relative sizes of stars, and Henrietta Leavitt showed how the cyclic changes of certain variable stars could serve as distance markers in space."

Other computers in the team included Williamina Fleming and Florence Cushman.  Although these women started primarily as calculators, they made significant contributions to astronomy, much of which they published in research articles.

History
Although Pickering believed that gathering data at astronomical observatories was not the most appropriate work, it seems that several factors contributed to his decision to hire women instead of men. Among them was that men were paid much more than women, so he could employ more staff with the same budget. This was relevant in a time when the amount of astronomical data was surpassing the capacity of the Observatories to process it. Although some of Pickering's female staff were astronomy graduates, their wages were similar to those of unskilled workers. They usually earned between 25 and 50 cents per hour (between $ and $ in ), more than a factory worker but less than a clerical one. In describing the dedication and efficiency with which the Harvard Computers, including Florence, undertook this effort, Edward Pickering said, "a loss of one minute in the reduction of each estimate would delay the publication of the entire work by the equivalent of the time of one assistant for two years."

The women were often tasked with measuring the brightness, position, and color of stars. The work included such tasks as classifying stars by comparing the photographs to known catalogs and reducing the photographs while accounting for things like atmospheric refraction in order to render the clearest possible image. Fleming herself described the work as "so nearly alike that there will be little to describe outside ordinary routine work of measurement, examination of photographs, and of work involved in the reduction of these observations".  At times women offered to work at the observatory for free in order to gain experience in a field that was difficult to get into.

Notable members

Mary Anna Palmer Draper 
Mary Anna Draper was the widow of Dr. Henry Draper, an astronomer who died before completing his work on the chemical composition of stars. She was very involved in her husband's work and wanted to finish his classification of stars after he died. Mary Draper quickly realized the task facing her was far too daunting for one person. She had received correspondence from Mr. Pickering, a close friend of hers and her husband's. Pickering offered to help finish her husband's work, and encouraged her to publish his findings up to the time of his death. After some deliberation and much consideration, Draper decided in 1886 to donate money and a telescope of her husband's to the Harvard Observatory in order to photograph the spectra of stars. She had decided this would be the best way to continue her husband's work and erect his legacy in astronomy. She was very insistent on funding the memorial project with her own inheritance, as it would carry on her husband's legacy. She was a dedicated follower of the observatory and a great friend of Pickering's. In 1900 she funded an expedition to see the total solar eclipse occurring that year.

Williamina Fleming 
Williamina Fleming had no prior relation to Harvard, as she was a Scottish immigrant working as Pickering's housemaid. Her first assignment was to improve an existing catalog of stellar spectra, which later lead to her appointment as head of the ‘’Henry Draper Catalogue’’ project.  Fleming went on to help develop a classification of stars based on their hydrogen content, as well as play a major role in discovering the strange nature of white dwarf stars. Williamina continued her career in astronomy when she was appointed Harvard's Curator of Astronomical Photographs in 1899, also known as Curator of the Photographic Plates. She remained the only woman curator until the 1950s. Her work also led to her becoming the first female American citizen to be elected to the Royal Astronomical Society in 1907.

Antonia Maury 
Antonia Maury was the niece of Henry Draper, and after recommendation from Mrs. Draper, was hired as a computer. She was a graduate from Vassar College, and was tasked with reclassifying some of the stars after the publication of the Henry Draper Catalog. Maury decided to go further and improved and redesigned the system of classification, but had other obligations and left the observatory in 1892 then again in 1894. Her work was finished with the help of Pickering and the computing staff and was published in 1897. She returned again in 1908 as an associate researcher.

Anna Winlock 
Some of the first women who were hired to work as computers had familial connections to the Harvard Observatory’s male staff. For instance, Anna Winlock, one of the first of the Harvard Computers, was the daughter of Joseph Winlock, the third director of the observatory and Pickering’s immediate predecessor. Anna Winlock joined the observatory in 1875 to assist in supporting her family after her father's unexpected passing. She tackled her father's unfinished data analysis, performing the arduous work of mathematically reducing meridian circle observations, which rescued a decade's worth of numbers that had been left in a useless state. Winlock also worked on a stellar cataloging section called the "Cambridge Zone". Working over twenty years on the project, the work done by her team on the Cambridge Zone contributed significantly to the Astronomische Gesellschaft Katalog, which contains information on more than one-hundred thousand stars and is used worldwide by many observatories and their researchers. Within a year of Anna Winlock's hiring, three other women joined the staff: Selina Bond, Rhoda Sauders, and a third, who was likely a relative of an assistant astronomer.

Annie Jump Cannon 
Pickering hired Annie Jump Cannon, a graduate of Wellesley College, to classify the southern stars.  While at Wellesley, she took astronomy courses from one of Pickering's star students, Sarah Frances Whiting.  She became the first female assistant to study variable stars at night.  She studied the light curve of variable stars which could help suggest the type and causation of variation.  Cannon, adding to work done by fellow computer Antonia Maury, greatly simplified [Pickering and Fleming's star classification based on temperature] system, and in 1922, the International Astronomical Union adopted [Cannon's] as the official classification system for stars....During Pickering’s 42-year tenure at the Harvard Observatory, which ended only a year before he died, in 1919, he received many awards, including the Bruce Medal, the Astronomical Society of the Pacific’s highest honor. Craters on the moon and on Mars are named after him.

And Annie Jump Cannon’s enduring achievement was dubbed the Harvard—not the Cannon—system of spectral classification.Cannon's Harvard Classification Scheme  is the basis of the today's familiar O B A F G K M system.  She also categorized the variable stars into tables so they could be identified and compared more easily.  These systems connect the color of stars to their temperature.

Annie Jump Cannon was the first female scientist to be recognized for many awards and titles in her field of study.  She was the first woman to receive an honorary doctorate from the University of Oxford and the Henry Draper Medal from the National Academy of Sciences, and the first female officer in the American Astronomical Society.  Cannon went on to establish her own Annie Jump Cannon Award for women in postdoctoral work.

Henrietta Leavitt 
Henrietta Swan Leavitt arrived at the observatory in 1893. She had experience through her college studies, traveling abroad, and teaching. In academia, Leavitt excelled in mathematics courses at Cambridge. When she began working at the observatory she was tasked with measuring star brightness through photometry.  She found hundreds of new variable stars after starting to analyze the Great Nebula in Orion and her work was expanded to study the variables of the entire sky with Annie Jump Cannon and Evelyn Leland.  With skills gained in photometry, Leavitt compared stars in different exposures.  Studying Cepheid variables in the Small Magellanic Cloud, she discovered that their apparent brightness was dependent on their period. Since all those stars were approximately the same distance from Earth, that meant their absolute brightness must depend on their period as well, allowing the use of Cepheid variables as a standard candle for determining cosmic distances. That, in turn, led directly to the modern understanding of the true size of the universe, and Cepheid variables are still an essential rung in the cosmic distance ladder.

Pickering published her work with his name as co-author.  The legacy she left allowed future scientists to make further discoveries in space.  Astronomer Edwin Hubble used Leavitt's method to calculate the distance of the nearest galaxy to the earth, the Andromeda Galaxy.  This led to the realization that there are even more galaxies than previously thought.

Florence Cushman 
Florence Cushman (1860-1940) was an American astronomer at the Harvard College Observatory who worked on the Henry Draper Catalogue.

Florence was born in Boston, Massachusetts in 1860 and received her early education at Charlestown High School, where she graduated in 1877. In 1888, she began work at the Harvard College Observatory as an employee of Edward Pickering. Her classifications of stellar spectra contributed to Henry Draper Catalogue between 1918 and 1934. She stayed as an astronomer at the Observatory until 1937 and died in 1940 at the age of 80.

Florence Cushman worked at the Harvard College Observatory from 1918 to 1937. Over the course of her nearly fifty-year career, she employed the objective prism method to analyze, classify, and catalog the optical spectra of hundreds of thousands of stars. In the 19th century, the photographic revolution enabled more detailed analysis of the night sky than had been possible with solely eye-based observations. In order to obtain optical spectra for measurement, male astronomers at the Harvard College Observatory expose glass plates on which the astronomical images were captured at night. During the daytime, female assistants like Florence analyzed the resultant spectra by reducing values, computing magnitudes, and cataloging their findings. She is credited with determining the positions and magnitudes of the stars listed in the 1918 edition of the Henry Draper Catalogue, which featured the spectra of roughly 222,000 stars.

See also 
Cecilia Payne-Gaposchkin
Evelyn Leland
Muriel Mussells Seyfert

References

External links 
 Pickering's Harem

 
American women astronomers
Harvard University staff
Sex segregation